Biddle Street is a neighborhood in east Baltimore, Maryland, United States.

References

Neighborhoods in Baltimore
East Baltimore